Eben S. Stearns (1819–1887) was an American educator. He served as the President of Framingham State University from 1849 to 1855, and as the Chancellor of the University of Nashville and President Peabody Normal School (which later merged with Vanderbilt University) from 1875 to 1887.

Early life
Eben Sperry Stearns was born on December 23, 1819 in Bedford, Massachusetts. His father was a Congregational minister.

Stearns enrolled at Harvard University in 1841, where he received a master of arts degree in 1845. He received a Doctor of Divinity and a Doctor of Laws from other universities.

Career
Stearns began his career as a teacher in an all girls' seminary in Ipswich, Massachusetts. He went on to teach in West Newton, Newburyport, Massachusetts, and Portland, Maine.

Stearns served as the President of Framingham State University from 1849 to 1855.

Stearns served as the Chancellor of the University of Nashville and President of the Peabody Normal School from 1875 to 1887. Under his leadership, the school attendance grew from 13 to 179 students. In 1885, he authored Historical Sketch of the Normal College, at Nashville, Tennessee.

Personal life
Stearns was married, and he had children.

Death and legacy
Stearns died on April 11, 1887 in Nashville, Tennessee. His funeral was held by an Episcopal pastor in Nashville, and he was buried in Bedford, Massachusetts.

Meanwhile, he was replaced as Chancellor of the University of Nashville and President of the Peabody Normal School by William H. Payne. A year after his death, in 1888, his portrait by Geo Drury was donated to the Peabody Normal College.

References

People from Bedford, Massachusetts
People from Nashville, Tennessee
Harvard University alumni
Framingham State University faculty
Heads of universities and colleges in the United States
1819 births
1887 deaths